The 2013/14 season saw Walsall finish 13th in League One. The campaign was most notable for the Saddlers' meetings with Black Country rivals Wolves, including a 1–0 away at Molineux.

Season summary
The summer of 2013 saw the Saddlers lose the attacking trio of Will Grigg, Febian Brandy and Jamie Paterson, who had been responsible for close to two-thirds of the club’s goals in the previous campaign. Their replacements included Chelsea loanee Milan Lalkovic, playmaker Romaine Sawyers and striker Troy Hewitt.

After a mixed start, September saw Walsall take on Wolves twice in the space of two weeks. A short trip to Molineux in the Football League Trophy saw Wolves emerge victorious on penalties following a 2–2 draw. However, the Saddlers had the better of the corresponding league fixture, winning 1–0 thanks to a goal from captain Andy Butler. Minor controversy followed the fixture with derogatory comments towards Wolves posted on Walsall’s official Twitter account. The club apologised for the "frankly disgusting" Tweet, which it said was the work of a hacker.

Walsall spent much of the first half of the season in and around the playoff spots, with a 5–1 away victory at Notts County lifting the club into sixth in late January. Despite seemingly being well-placed for a playoff challenge, the Saddlers went on to win just twice in the final 18 games of the season. This included a 3–0 home loss to Wolves, who would finish the season as champions.

This disastrous run saw the Saddlers end the campaign in 13th, 16 points adrift of a playoff place.

Competitions

Football League One

League table

Results

FA Cup

League Cup

League Trophy

First-team squad
Squad at end of season

Left club during season

Squad statistics
Source:

Numbers in parentheses denote appearances as substitute.
Players with squad numbers struck through and marked  left the club during the playing season.
Players with names in italics and marked * were on loan from another club for the whole of their season with Walsall.
Players listed with no appearances have been in the matchday squad but only as unused substitutes.
Key to positions: GK – Goalkeeper; DF – Defender; MF – Midfielder; FW – Forward

References

Walsall F.C. seasons
Walsall